Brett Hearn (born September 1, 1958) is a semi-retired modified stock car driver from Kinnelon, New Jersey.  He currently serves as race director at Orange County Fair Speedway

Hearn has amassed 919 wins in a stock car over the course of his professional career which has spanned four decades.  He won his first-ever Modified feature event at Nazareth Speedway and was the last Modified driver to score a win on the half-mile track because weeks later, the track was torn down to make way for a strip mall and grocery store.
He competed in twenty NASCAR Busch Series events in his career, spanning from 1985 to 1989, using the same chassis in every race. He earned just one top-ten: a 10th at Dover International Speedway and earned his best points finish of 41st in 1986.

Career highlights 

920 Wins—574 Modified, 343 Small- Block Modified, 2 Sprint Car
363 Wins in races 50 laps or longer
Wins at 49 tracks in eleven states and two Canadian provinces
79 Track and Series Championships
All-Time Winner Orange County Fair Speedway 302 Wins (174 Modified) (112 Small-Block Modified) (2 Sprint Car)
All-Time Winner Albany-Saratoga Speedway 108 Wins
Hearn has won races at 49 different race tracks in 10 states and 2 provinces.

Personal life 

Born in Paterson, New Jersey to parents Gordon and Kay, Hearn got his first taste of racing when he was 8-years old at the Orange County Fair Speedway in Middletown, NY.  Brett began driving go-karts and when he turned 16, his father Gordon encouraged Brett to try stock car racing.  His dad bought a car from Glen Carlson and the Hearn's built the engine in their family room.  Brett crashed his No. 20 blue-and-silver Pinto-body car the first time out and a number of other times.

He currently resides in Vernon Township, New Jersey.  He has two children, Brooke (born 4/11/92) Tyler (born 6/18/95).  He is the owner of BH Enterprises, Inc. which consists of his racing team, fabrication shop, driving school and performance equipment manufacturer.  Besides racing his other hobbies and interests include jet skiing, golfing and fishing.

Motorsports career results

Career championships

NASCAR
(key) (Bold – Pole position awarded by qualifying time. Italics – Pole position earned by points standings or practice time. * – Most laps led.)

Busch Series

References

External links 

Living people
1958 births
People from Kinnelon, New Jersey
Sportspeople from Paterson, New Jersey
People from Vernon Township, New Jersey
Racing drivers from New Jersey
NASCAR drivers
USAC Silver Crown Series drivers